Robert Daniel Nault  (born November 9, 1955) is a Canadian politician.

A member of the Liberal Party of Canada, Nault began his career as city councillor for Kenora City Council. He was first elected to the House of Commons as the representative for Kenora—Rainy River in 1988, beating NDP incumbent John Parry. Following the 1988 election, Nault ran successfully in the 1993,1997, and 2000 federal elections.

Nault also served as Minister of Indian Affairs and Northern Development in the cabinet of Jean Chrétien from 1999 to 2003. He introduced a comprehensive program of reform and financial accountability measures for First Nations.

In 2004, he announced he would leave politics and did not seek re-election in the 2004 election.

After his first stint in the House of Commons, Nault provided advisory and consulting services to high-technology firms, First Nations, and major public sector organizations.

In January 2015, Nault announced his intention to seek the Liberal Party of Canada nomination for Kenora, which includes nearly all of his old riding, in the 2015 federal election scheduled for October 19.  On May 31, 2015, Nault was nominated as the party's candidate. In the ensuing election, he edged out former provincial NDP leader Howard Hampton, who had represented the area provincially from 1987 to 2011, by only 2% to return to Parliament after a 12-year absence.  Incumbent Conservative and cabinet minister Greg Rickford was pushed into third place.

In February 2016, Nault was elected Chair by committee members of the Foreign Affairs and International Development Committee.

He was defeated in the 2019 federal election.

Electoral record

References

External links

 Interview with the Frontier Centre for Public Policy
 Robert Nault Profile - The Canadian Encyclopedia
 Macleans Interview - 2013

1955 births
Living people
Members of the House of Commons of Canada from Ontario
Liberal Party of Canada MPs
Canadian Ministers of Indian Affairs and Northern Development
Members of the 26th Canadian Ministry
Members of the King's Privy Council for Canada
People from Kenora
Ontario municipal councillors
Franco-Ontarian people